The Lao She Literary Award (Lao She wenxue jiang 老舍文学奖) is named after the Chinese patriot and novelist Lao She, whose work and activism made him one of the most influential figures in 20th-century Chinese literature. The award is awarded to a Beijing writer every two to three years, recognising literary excellence in novels, novellas, drama, film, television, and radio. It is sponsored by the Lao She Literature Fund which was founded in 1988. The prize was established in 1999, and was first awarded in 2000. It is Beijing's highest prize for literature and the arts, and is one of the four major literary awards in China (the Mao Dun Prize for Literature, Lu Xun Literary Prize, and the Cao Yu Prize for Playwriting (曹禺戏剧文学奖).

Winners of the First Awards (2000)

Outstanding novels
Ling Li (writer)  凌力《梦断关河》
Liu Yuxin (writer)  刘育新《古街》

Outstanding novellas
Liu Heng  刘恒《贫嘴张大民的幸福生活》
Tie Ning — How Long Is Forever?

Outstanding drama scripts
Zhang Yonghe and Wang Baochun  张永和、王保春《烟壶》（曲剧）
Guo Qihong  郭启宏《司马相如》（昆曲）

TV series
Year After Year (screenplay: Li Xiaoming / directors: An Zhanjun, Li Xiaolong) 《一年又一年》（编剧：李晓明，导演：安战军、李小龙）
Leaving Lei Feng Day (screenplay: Wang Xingdong / directors: Lei Xianwo, Kang Ning) 《离开雷锋的日子》（编剧：王兴东，导演：雷献禾、康宁）　　　　　
Backbone (screenplay: Luo Jin / director: Li Jian) 《脊梁》（编剧：罗金，导演：李健） 　　　　　　　 　　
Immortal Fame (screenplay: Liu Baoyi / director: Li Jian) 《千古流芳》（编剧：刘宝毅，导演：李健）

Winners of the Second Awards (2005)

Outstanding novels
Zhang Jie  张洁《无字》
Ning Ken  宁肯《蒙面之城》

Outstanding novellas
Liu Qingbang  刘庆邦《神木》
Zeng Zhe  曾哲《一年级二年级》
Yi Xiangdong  衣向东《初三初四看月亮》

Outstanding drama scripts
Li Longyun  李龙云《正红旗下》
Chen Jianqiu  陈健秋《宰相刘罗锅》（京剧）

Winners of the Third Awards (2005)

Outstanding novels
Yan Lianke  阎连科《受活》
Ning Ken  宁肯《蒙面之城》

Outstanding novellas
Zeng Zhe  曾哲《香歌潭》
Cheng Qing  程青《十周岁》

Outstanding drama scripts
Lan Xiaolong  兰晓龙《爱尔纳·突击》

Best work by a new writer
Wei Ran  尉然《李大筐的脚和李小筐的爱情》
Mao Yinpeng  毛银鹏《故人西辞》

Winners of the Fourth Awards (2011)

Outstanding novels
Xu Kun  徐坤《八月狂想曲》
Ning Ken  宁肯《天藏》
Ma Lihua  马丽华《如意高地》

Outstanding novellas
Ye Guangqin  叶广芩《豆汁记》
Liu Qingbang  刘庆邦《哑炮》
Jing Yongming  荆永鸣《大声呼吸》
Zhong Jingjing  钟晶晶《我的左手》

Winners of the Fifth Awards (2014)

Outstanding novels
Xu Zechen  徐则臣《耶路撒冷》
Lin Bai  林白《北去来辞》

Outstanding novellas
Wen Zhen  文珍《安翔路情事》
Jiang Yun  蒋韵《朗霞的西街》
Jing Yongming  荆永鸣《北京房东》
Ge Fei  格非《隐身衣》

Outstanding drama scripts
Wan Fang  万方《忏悔》（话剧）
Li Jing  李静《鲁迅》（话剧）

References

 
Chinese literary awards